HMS L23 was a L-class submarine built for the Royal Navy during World War I. The boat was not completed before the end of the war and was one of three L-class boats to serve during World War II. L23 was sold for scrap in 1946.

Design and description
L9 and its successors were enlarged to accommodate 21-inch (53.3 cm) torpedoes and more fuel. They displaced  on the surface and  submerged. The L-class submarines had a crew of 35 officers and ratings.

For surface running, the boats were powered by two 12-cylinder Vickers  diesel engines, each driving one propeller shaft. When submerged each propeller was driven by a  electric motor. They could reach  on the surface and  underwater.

The boats were armed with four 21-inch torpedo tubes in the bow and two 18-inch (45 cm) in broadside mounts. They carried four reload torpedoes for the 21-inch tubes for a grand total of ten torpedoes of all sizes. They were also armed with a  deck gun.

Construction and career
HMS L23 was laid down on 26 July 1917 by Vickers at their Barrow-in-Furness shipyard, launched on 1 July 1919. The boat was then towed to Chatham Royal Dockyard and finished on 31 October 1924. She served on the China Station in the 1920s. HMS L23 survived a heavy depth charge attack by two German destroyers in February 1940. An oil leak occurred, which lead the Germans to believe that the submarine was destroyed. L23 was sold for scrap in May 1946.

Notes

References
 
 
 
 

 

British L-class submarines
Ships built in Barrow-in-Furness
1919 ships
World War I submarines of the United Kingdom
Royal Navy ship names